Ihor Olefirenko (born 14 March 1990) is a Ukrainian long distance runner and archer. He finished 30th in the marathon at the 2016 Summer Olympics. In 2020, he competed in the men's race at the 2020 World Athletics Half Marathon Championships held in Gdynia, Poland.

References

External links

 

1990 births
Living people
Ukrainian male long-distance runners
Ukrainian male marathon runners
Place of birth missing (living people)
Athletes (track and field) at the 2016 Summer Olympics
Olympic athletes of Ukraine